The starry handfish, Halieutaea stellata, is a batfish of the family Ogcocephalidae found on the continental shelves of the Indo-Pacific oceans at depths of between 50 and 400 m.  They are up to 30 cm long.

References
 
 Tony Ayling & Geoffrey Cox, Collins Guide to the Sea Fishes of New Zealand,  (William Collins Publishers Ltd, Auckland, New Zealand 1982) 

Ogcocephalidae
Fish described in 1797